Waynehead is an animated television series created by actor/comedian Damon Wayans and ran from 1996 to 1997 on Kids' WB, and on YTV from 1996 to 1998. It was a co-production of Warner Bros. Animation and Nelvana, with overseas animation by TMS-Kyokuchi Corporation, Hanho Heung-Up Co., Ltd., and Philippine Animation Studio, Inc.

Waynehead lasted for 13 episodes for one season; Wayans stated that he was told by Warner Bros. that the show wasn't black enough or funny enough, to which a WB executive replied by stating that the show was merely low-rated. It is about a young boy named Damey Wayne from a poor background with a club foot and was based on Wayans' own childhood in the Chelsea neighborhood in the New York City borough of Manhattan. Actors who provided voices for the show included Gary Coleman, Orlando Brown, and Marlon Wayans.

Voice cast
 Orlando Brown as Damey "Waynehead" Wayne
 Tico Wells as Marvin
 Jamil Walker Smith as Mo' Money, Jr.
 T'Keyah Crystal Keymáh as Roz, Shavonne, Aki
 Shawn Wayans as Toof
 Marlon Wayans as Blue
 Gary Coleman as Kevin
 Kim Wayans as Mrs. Wayne
 John Witherspoon as Mr. Wayne
 Frank Welker as Tripod

Characters

Main
 Damey "Waynehead" Wayne: The leader of the group.
 Mo' Money, Jr.: Damey's best friend with a southern accent. He is the lancer and the toughest member of the group. He is always eager to scam someone out of money, even his friends.
 Roz: Damey's love interest. Roz is the only female in the group. She is the most athletic member and the third in command of the group.
 Toof: Mo' Money's candy-loving partner. He has a single tooth and an extreme love for all things candy. He is having a hard time rapping when he doesn't know how to rhyme.
 Marvin: Damey's frenemy, more friend than foe. He is tended to talk about some tall tales.

Episodes

Series overview

Season 1 (1996–97)

Production 
The series was first announced in 1991 as The Wayneheads. It was originally going to be a claymation series and was going to air on Fox. The concept was shelved and was retooled as a traditionally-animated series that ran on Kids' WB from 1996 to 1997.

Broadcast 
The show was aired on Kids' WB from 1996 to 1997, and eventually aired reruns on Cartoon Network from 1998 to 2000.

International
In Canada, Waynehead aired on YTV from 1996 to 1998.

In Germany, Waynehead aired on ProSieben, Junior, and K-Toon under the name of Waynehead - Echt cool, Mann!.

In Austria, the series aired on ORF 1.

In the United Kingdom, the series aired on CITV in 1998.

In Israel, Waynehead aired on Arutz HaYeladim.

In Ireland, Waynehead aired on RTÉ2.

Home media
Since April 20, 2021, Waynehead was released on iTunes, Amazon Video and Vudu.

References in other media
The Waynehead theme song is parodied in the Pinky and the Brain episode "Dangerous Brains".

References

External links
 
 Waynehead at TV Guide

1990s American animated television series
1990s American black cartoons
1996 American television series debuts
1997 American television series endings
1990s Canadian animated television series
1990s Canadian black cartoons
1996 Canadian television series debuts
1997 Canadian television series endings
American children's animated adventure television series
American children's animated comedy television series
Canadian children's animated adventure television series
Canadian children's animated comedy television series
Kids' WB original shows
The WB original programming
YTV (Canadian TV channel) original programming
ProSieben original programming
ITV (TV network) original programming
Television series by Nelvana
Television series by Warner Bros. Animation
Television shows set in New York City
Animated television series about children
Television shows filmed in Montreal
Television shows filmed in Toronto
Television shows filmed in California
Black people in art
Animation based on real people